This is a listing of the horses that finished in either first, second, third or fourth place and earned a purse check along with the number of starters in the Preakness Stakes, the second leg of the United States Triple Crown of Thoroughbred Racing run at 1-3/16 mile on dirt for three-year-olds at Pimlico Race Course in Baltimore, Maryland.

A  † designates a Triple Crown Winner.
A  ‡ designates a Filly.
Note:  D. Wayne Lukas swept the 1995 Triple Crown with two different horses.

References

External links 

Preakness Stakes website
Preakness Stakes
ESPN.com Attending the Preakness (includes future dates)

Pimlico Race Course
Preakness Stakes
Lists of horse racing results